The following colleges and universities were founded by Christian organisations. The list covers universities and colleges that were founded in the then British crown colony of Hong Kong and the Portuguese overseas province of Macau. It also covers universities and colleges that were founded in mainland China but were later moved to or reestablished in Taiwan.

Colleges and universities

Existing 
Anglo-Chinese College, Xiamen 
Anglo-Chinese College, Fuzhou 
Anglo-Chinese College, Tinkling 
Anglo-Chinese College, Shanghai 
Anglo-Chinese College, Shantou 
Anglo-Chinese College, Tianjin
Aletheia University
Chang Jung Christian University
Chung Chi College, The Chinese University of Hong Kong
Chung Yuan Christian University
Fu Jen Academy, later Catholic University of Peking, now Fu Jen Catholic University
Hong Kong Baptist University 
Kung Hong School
Lingnan University
St. Mark's Anglo-Chinese College
St. John's College, The University of Hong Kong
Tunghai University
Soochow University, Suzhou
Talmage College
St. John's University (Taiwan)
Ying Wa College
Peking Union Medical College

Defunct 

Yenching University
Boone College and University, Wuchang, Hubei
Canton Christian College
Central China University
Effie Sears School for Girls (1890) Pingdu
English Methodist College, Ningbo
Foochow College, Fuzhou
Foochow Girls College, Fuzhou
Fukien Christian University, merged with the Fujian Superior Normal School in 1953 to become the Fujian Techer's College, now Fujian Normal School
Ginling College, Nanjing
Hangchow University, alternatively known as Hangchow Christian College, Hangzhou
Hwa Nan College, Fuzhou (later Nanjing)
 John Carter School for Girls; later part of North China Baptist College, Longkou
Griffith John College, Hankou
Manchuria Mission College, Shenyang 
Medhurst College, Shanghai
Mukden Medical College, Shenyang
Nanking Union University
North China Baptist College, Longkou
North China Union College
Pingtu Institute for Boys (1890), Pingdu
Providence University
St. John's University, Shanghai
Shaluet College, Shantou
Shanghai Baptist College, now Shanghai University 
Shantung Christian University, Union Medical College, Jinan
Shantung Christian College, Jinan
Training School for Bible Women (1901), Lanzhou
University of Nanking, Nanjing
West China Union University, Chengdu (1896, Funded by Joseph Beech,O.L.Kilborn and R.T.Davidson)
Williams Memorial School for Girls (1906), Yantai
Yenching University, Beijing

Theological colleges and seminaries

Anhui Seminary, Anhui
Ashmore Theological Seminary, Shantou
Bush Theological Seminary (1885) later part of North China Baptist College Longkou
East China Theological College
Fujian Theological College
Guangdong Union Theological College
Hunan Bible Institute
Mukden (Presbyterian) Theological College, Shenyang
Nanjing Union Theological Seminary
North China Union College of Theology 
North China Theological Seminary
North East Theological College
Shaanxi Bible College
Shandong Theological College
 Shantung Christian University, Theological College, Qingzhou
Shanghai Baptist Theological Seminary 
Sichuan Theological College
Yanjing Union Theological College
Yunnan Theological College
Zhejiang Theological College
Zhong Nan Theological Seminary

 
China, List of Christian Colleges in